The Ventominho Wind Farm is located close to the Spanish border in north-western Portugal.  It includes 120 wind turbines, each of  2 MW capacity, supplied by German manufacturer Enercon. With 240 MW in total capacity and a single point of connection to the grid, the onshore wind farm is now fully operational.

References

Wind farms in Portugal